Ashoka Vanamlo Arjuna Kalyanam is a 2022 Indian Telugu-language romantic comedy film directed by Vidya Sagar Chinta and written by Ravi Kiran Kola. Produced by SVCC Digital, the film stars Vishwak Sen, Ritika Naik and Rukshar Dhillon. The plot follows Arjun Kumar Allam, a 33-year old bachelor who gets engaged to Madhavi, however she elopes before the wedding.

The film's editing and cinematography is done by Viplav Nyshadam and Pavi K Pavan respectively. The film's music is composed by Jay Krish. The film was released on 6 May 2022.

Plot
Arjun Kumar Allam (Vishwak Sen) is a 33 Year old guy from Suryapet in Telangana. As his family are unable to find girls in their community, they get into an alliance with a family in Ashokapuram Village in Andhra Pradesh. They travel to Ashokapuram for the engagement ceremony with Madhavi (Rukshar Dhillon). Though Arjun is keen to talk to Madhavi, she appears to be shy and less talkative. Madhavi has a younger sister Vasudha (Ritika Nayak) who is more talkative in nature. During the pre-wedding shoot, Arjun notices that Madhavi has tears in her eyes. As Arjun's family is about to leave to their town, the bus breaks down which makes them stay for few more days in the same house. Further attempts to leave the house get blocked due to the government imposing a lockdown due to the COVID-19 pandemic.

Arjun drops a paper with his mobile number and Madhavi chats with him on whatsapp, which makes him happy. Due to mis-understanding, Arjun tries to kiss Madhavi and she slaps him in return. Arjun soon realizes that its Vasudha who has been chatting with him all this while and he assumed that it was Madhavi. As the elders agree to get them married earlier, Arjun says that he needs some time to agree to the wedding. Vasudha figures out that Arjun was slapped by Madhavi and tries to patch up the mis-understanding. Vasudha gets to know that Madhavi is in love with another guy from her college and their parents have forced her to the engagement. Due to Vasudha, Madhavi talks to Arjun and says sorry. Arjun agrees to the wedding and informs the elders. 

Next day, every one gets a shock as Madhavi elopes with another guy. This creates a rift between the elders on either sides. As Arjun's family starts to leave the village on road, the local MLA Rajaram (Vennela Kishore) and police force them back to go back to Madhavi's house due to Corona restrictions and MLA gives clear instructions to the volunteers to get signature daily from all of them till the Covid restrictions are lifted. An upset Arjun drinks along with his relatives and blasts them for creating rifts. Arjun has a rift with Vasudha, who comes to console him and asks her if she would have married an ordinary guy like Arjun? Vasudha starts thinking about this.

Meanwhile, Arjun's pregnant sister (Vidya Sivalenka) get pains and she is admitted in a hospital. Vasudha helps Arjun for the travel and arranging food for his sister in the hospital. Arjun saves Vasudha from some bad guys in the village market and Vasudha informs Arjun that she likes him. When asked by Arjun's sister about her marriage, Vasudha tells her that she needs at least 3 more years as she has few responsibilities and wanted to clear financial debts of her family. Arjun gets frustrated as he is already 33 and cannot wait for 3 more years with constant pressure from his parents and relatives. When Vasudha shows him random matrimonial pictures, frustrated Arjun says yes to everyone without even looking at the photo. Vasudha feels bad and tells him to look at the girl next time before leaving her place and his heart will come to a halt if she is the right girl for him. 

Arjun's brother-in-law comes to the place with permission slips and facilities to take everyone home. Around the same time, the local police inform Madhavi's father about Madhavi and her lover Vikram (Ashok Selvan). Madhavi's lover tells him that the reason Madhavi left the house was their decision of using the caste as a barrier for the wedding. However, Madhavi couldn't stay long without her father and hence, decided to convince their parents instead. This creates a further rift between the families as Madhavi returns home. The next day, when they start to leave the house, Arjun looks at Vasudha and he slowly realizes that Vasudha is indeed the right girl for him. He stops the car half way and informs his parents that he wants to marry Vasudha and he is ready to wait till Vasudha is ready for the wedding.

Arjun goes back to the village and proposes to Vasudha indicating that he will wait for her as long as she needs. Vasudha happily agrees and the marriage takes place after 3 years.

Cast 
Vishwak Sen as Arjun Kumar Allam
Rukshar Dhillon as Pasupuleti Madhavi
Ritika Nayak as Pasupuleti Vasudha, Madhavi's sister, Arjun's wife
Kadambari Kiran as Poleti Suribabu, Madhavi's uncle
Vadlamani Srinivas as Madhavi's father
Goparaju Ramana as Arjun's uncle
Kedar Shankar as Arjun's father
Vidya Sivalenka as Arjun's sister
Rajkumar Kasireddy as photographer
Vennela Kishore as MLA Rajaram
Kishore Kumar Polimera as Police SI
Dubbing Janaki as Madhavi's and Vasudha's grand mother
Ashok Selvan as Vikram (cameo appearance)

Production 
The film was launched on 16 April 2021 in Hyderabad. It is directed by Vidya Sagar Chinta who previously worked on the films Raja Vaaru Rani Gaaru and Falaknuma Das as cinematographer and story, screenplay, dialogues were written by Ravi Kiran Kola who's also the showrunner of the film.

Soundtrack 

The soundtrack of the film is composed by Jay Krish, of Raja Vaaru Rani Gaaru fame.

Release 
The film was released in theatres on 6 May 2022 worldwide.

Reception 
A reviewer from The Hans India gave the film a rating of 3.5/5 stars and wrote "'Ashoka Vanamlo Arjuna Kalyanam' is a perfect fun-filled family entertainer from Tollywood for this summer. Honest writing, brilliant execution, and genuine performances." Neeshita Nyayapati of The Times of India gave the film a rating of 3/5 stars and wrote "Ashoka Vanamlo Arjuna Kalyanam is one of those films where you see the scenes and are hit with nostalgia". Arvind V of Pinkvilla gave the film a rating of 2.5/5 stars and wrote "Vishwak Sen's awesome act makes this convenient story watchable". Sangeetha Devi Dundoo of The Hindu stated "An effective Vishwak Sen powers this heartwarming story of life and marriage".

References

External Links 

2022 films
2020s Telugu-language films
Indian romantic comedy films
2022 romantic comedy films
Films set in Andhra Pradesh